The WAGR A class was a class of 2-6-0 steam locomotives designed by Beyer, Peacock & Co and operated by the Western Australian Government Railways (WAGR) between 1881 and 1955.

History
The first A class engine was ordered from Beyer, Peacock & Co, Manchester by John Robb, the contractor building the first section of the Eastern Railway between Fremantle and Guildford. It arrived in Western Australia in 1880 and was similar in design to the South Australian Railways W class.

The WAGR acquired this locomotive upon completion of the construction contract in 1881 and numbered it 3 Other locomotives of the same design, were later purchased both new and second hand. When engine class designations were introduced in 1885, the locomotives became the A class. When engine class designations were introduced in 1885, this whole group of engines became the A class. All but one of the 13 A class engines was built by Beyer, Peacock & Co; the other was built by Dübs & Co. Three had six-wheel tenders as opposed to four-wheel varieties.

The A class was used initially for main line passenger services, and later on branch lines. Some were sold to timber mills. The last was withdrawn in 1955, and two examples were preserved. A11 was placed on display at the Perth Zoo and is now with the Western Australian Rail Transport Museum, while A15 was plinthed in Bunbury and is currently under restoration in Meredith, Victoria.

Namesake
The A class designation was reused in the 1960s when the A class diesel locomotives entered service.

See also

History of rail transport in Western Australia
List of Western Australian locomotive classes

References

Notes

Cited works

External links

Beyer, Peacock locomotives
Dübs locomotives
Railway locomotives introduced in 1880
A WAGR class
2-6-0 locomotives
3 ft 6 in gauge locomotives of Australia